New Barnet Friends Meeting House is a Quaker meeting house in Leicester Road, New Barnet, north London. It was designed by Leonard Brown, who also designed Quaker meeting houses in Peterborough and Colchester and worked on Letchworth Garden City.

Quakers are known in Hertfordshire, of which New Barnet was once a part, from around 1655. A Quaker meeting has taken place in New Barnet since at least 1873 when its proceedings were reported in the Christian Age, the Baptist, and The Herald of Peace. The New Barnet meeting house opened in the 1930s.

References

External links 

New Barnet
Quaker meeting houses in London
20th-century Quaker meeting houses